NGC 5090 and NGC 5091 are a set of galaxies approximately  away in the constellation Centaurus. They are in the process of colliding and merging with some evidence of tidal disruption of NGC 5091.

NGC 5090 is an elliptical galaxy while NGC 5091 is a barred spiral galaxy. NGC 5090 is associated with the strong, double radio source PKS 1318-43.

See also 
 ESO 269-57
 NGC 2207 and IC 2163
 NGC 6872 and IC 4970

References

External links 
 "Of Holes in the Sky and Pretty Galaxies" by the European Southern Observatory
 
 

Barred spiral galaxies
Elliptical galaxies
Interacting galaxies
Peculiar galaxies
Centaurus (constellation)
J13211286
270-2
46618
-07-27-054
5090
46618